Michael Paul Voigt (September 23, 1958 – March 24, 2018) was president of the United States Practical Shooting Association (USPSA)  from 2000 to 2012.

He later worked for Surefire LLC in the Suppressor R&D division, in addition to working with Safariland R&D.

Michael has won numerous world and national titles in handgun, shotgun, rifle, and multigun through over 30 years of competition. A few of these titles include the IPSC World Championship Individual titles 3 times, IPSC World Team Championship 7 times, IPSC Continental Shotgun 2 times, IPSC Continental handgun 2 times, International Tactical Rifle Championship 5 times and USPSA multi-gun 14 times.

Michael Voigt was influential in the formation of Strayer Voigt Inc and their line of Infinity Firearms of modular wide-frame 1911s, also called 2011s. Strayer-Voigt, Inc. was started in June 1994 when its founder Sandy Strayer left STI International Inc to form his own company, and then joined forces with Michael Voigt who contributed both as a professional shooter and gunsmith.

Michael died in 2018 from cancer.

References

External links 
 Official homepage
 https://web.archive.org/web/20090702065557/http://www.shootingusa.com/PRO_TIPS/MICHAEL_VOIGT/michael_voigt.html

1958 births
2018 deaths
IPSC shooters
IPSC World Shoot Champions
American male sport shooters
Place of birth missing